Cenderawasih University is a university in Jayapura, Papua province, Indonesia. The university is the leading educational institution in the province.

The university has faculties in economics, law, teacher training and education, medical, engineering, and social and political science. Until 2002 the university had a faculty of agricultural sciences at Manokwari, which was then separated to form the Universitas Negeri Papua. The university is divided into two areas: mainly the "Kampus lama" (old campus) which is in the Jayapura suburb of Abepura and the "Kampus baru" (new campus) which is in the hillside of Waena valley.

In 2021 it appointed the first woman, Marlina Flassy, to a deanship in its history. Flassy, an anthropologist, was appointed as Dean of the Faculty of Social and Political Sciences, and is also the first indigenous Papuan to hold the position.

Kampus Lama (old campus) Abepura 

 Faculty of Teacher Training and Education
 Faculty of Medicine
 Faculty of Public Health
 Faculty of Law (Library & Extension)
 Faculty of Social and Political Science (Extension)
 Faculty of Nursing

Kampus Baru (new campus) Waena HillSide 
 Faculty of Economics
 Faculty of Social and Political Sciences (Main Building)
 Faculty of Law (Main Faculty)
 Faculty of Mathematics and Natural Sciences
 Faculty of Engineering

Alumni
Among the well-known alumni of the university is John Rumbiak, who founded the human rights organisation the Institute of Human Rights Studies and Advocacy (ELS-HAM) in Jayapura. The governor of Papua Province, Barnabas Suebu, and the Indonesian footballer, Boaz Solossa started his higher education at the university.

Rectors 
This is a list of academicians who served as rectors in the Cenderawasih University
Soegarda Poerbakawatja (1962–1967)
R. Bintoro (1967–1968)
Adi Andojo Soetjipto (1968–1969)
August Marpaung (1969–1970)
Soekisno Hadikoemoro (1970–1975)
Rubini Atmawidjaja (1975–1978)
Rudy Tarumingkeng (1979–1983)
August Kafiar (1988–1996)
Frans A. Wospakrik (1996–2005)
 (2005–2011)
Festus Simbiak (2011–2013)
Karel Sesa (2013–2015)
Onesimus Sahuleka (2015–2017)
Apolo Safanpo (2017–2022)
Oscar Wambrauw (2022–now)

References

External links
Universitas Negeri Papua—(Indonesian language)
official  Cenderawasih University Christian Student Fellowship website—(Indonesian language)

Cenderawasih University
Jayapura
Indonesian state universities
1962 establishments in Indonesia
Educational institutions established in 1962